Supermen may refer to:

 Supermen (anthology), science fiction anthology edited by Isaac Asimov et al., published in 1984
 "The Supermen", song written by David Bowie in 1970
 Supermen, a 1979 album by Ferrante & Teicher

See also
 Superman (disambiguation)